Peter Bartalský (born 27 January 1978) is a Slovak football goalkeeper who currently plays for the Prague Championship club SK Třeboradice and former manager of Czech club Sparta Prague (women).

Bartalský joined Bohemians Prague in 2015.

References

External links

 at fotbalportal.cz 

1978 births
Living people
Slovak footballers
Association football goalkeepers
FK Inter Bratislava players
FK Viktoria Žižkov players
ŠK Slovan Bratislava players
AS Trenčín players
FK Bohemians Prague (Střížkov) players
Slovak Super Liga players
Czech First League players
Sportspeople from Malacky
Slovak football managers